Tachypeles rossii is a species of ground beetle in the subfamily Paussinae in the genus Tachypeles. It was discovered by the scientist Deuve in 2004.

References

Paussinae
Beetles described in 2004